The Giriama (also called Giryama) are one of the nine ethnic groups that make up the Mijikenda (which literally translates to "nine towns").

The Mijikenda occupy the coastal strip extending from Lamu in the north to the Kenya/Tanzania border in the south, and approximately 30 km inland. The Giriama are among the largest of these ethnic groups. They inhabit the area bordered by the coastal cities of Mombasa and Malindi, and the inland towns of Mariakani and Kaloleni.

The Giriama is one of the largest groups of the Mijikenda people in the back-up area of the Northeast coast of Kenya. The Giriama are subdivided into clans which include Thoya, Mweni, Nyundo, Nyale and so on. The Giriama are a peaceful people who practiced active resistance against the British.

In recent years, the Giriama have extended their living space down to the coast. They are now a big part of service employees in the growing tourism centres. Education programmes initiated by the state included building of central primary schools alongside the coast street. School attendance has become compulsory even for girls up to an age of 12 years. The continuous migration of Giriama to places such as Takaungu and Mtwapa has allowed them to get access to paid labour, hence they have become part of manpower resources, which were once dominated by the Chonyi. 
The relationship of the Giriama to other Mijikenda groups such as the Ribe, Rabai, Digo and Duruma is rather loose. The Kamba and Jibana have mixed with the coastal population in recent decades. Only a very few villages could sustain them. The Kauma have also been assimilated. The area around the Kilifi Creek is inhabited by Giriama up to nearly 90 percent.

Background 
The Giriama people are one of the nine groups which make up the Mijikenda, a Coastal Bantu community which means nine villages and is believed to have migrated from Shungwaya, a place near Fort Dumford in present-day Soma (Temu, 1971, p. 167). The other villages are the Digo, Duruma, Rabai, Ribe, Kauma, Kambe, Chonyi, and the Jibana. The Giriama migrated from Shungawa in which they further migrated towards the coastal region of Kenya due to conflicts with other Kenyan communities. “They lacked any cooperative political organization until the late 1940s, when they assumed a collective political identification by choosing the name Mijikenda and form· ing the Mijikenda Union.” (Brantley, 1981, p. 6). At the top of the Giriama hierarchy are the ‘Kambi’ which are the council of elders who reside “in Kaya Fungo as the highest court of appeal for all social, political and civic matt” (Temu 1971, p. 167). Below the Kambi on the hierarchy are the spiritual leaders who are tasked with spreading the influence of religion and spirituality to the people of Giriama and practicing rituals.

The Giriamia had a very strong sense for agriculture and were very adept at farming, rearing cows, growing millet, producing cotton and fishing in the Indian Ocean. They were often involved in foreign trade of the goods they produced such as iron in exchange for clothes from the Swahili and Arabs. The people of Giriama have gained a reputation of resistance as they have a long history of rebelling against pressure by foreigners including the “Galla, the Swahili, the Maasai, the Arabs and the…and under pressure at times they have migrated to new lands, other times they have negotiated with their oppressors, and they have occasionally violently resisted.” (Beckloff, 2009, p. 11). in 1914, the British colonial government aimed to exploit the Giriama as a source of labour to work building the plantations of the coast of Kenya in which the people of Giriama resisted. However, "due to the overwhelming technological advantage of the British, the revolt was brought to a relatively quick and bloody end. In many ways the Giriama have never recovered from this blow".

Giriama uprising 
Giriama's involvement in the Kenyan resistance of the 1912 is of great historical significance as it inevitably shaped Giriama's history and culture. The British colonial government was attempting to find a source of labour for rapidly emerging cash crop plantations on the coast of Kenya for environmental benefits such as water quality, soil improvement and salinity mitigation. As such, the colonial government aimed to "organize all Giriama [though] their traditional political organization, based on councils of elders, reflected regional and economic differentiation" through a practise of co-optation, which amounted to forced labor. The people of Giriama did not approve of the policies of the colonial government which instigated a rebellion against the British influence. The people of Giriama did not have the appropriate society in order to effectively rebel against the British as "it has long been assumed that societies need hierarchies, bureaucracies, and stratifications in order to rebel, but when the Giriama rebelled they had none of these organizational forms".

The initial Giriama response to these colonial policies was based on past pressures "on their whole way of life by strangers who were probably perceived by them as independent or semi-independent warlords; men who pillaged and abused the people in order to enrich themselves and perhaps also the other strangers who now lived on the coast". The Giriama were confronted with the "sudden arrival of these powerful foreigners who imposed taxes, censuses, forced labor, new rules, and regulation of commerce [which] was bound to be extremely upsetting. Moreover, the newcomers showed no respect for the Giriama or their institutions as was clearly shown by the lack of sensitivity on the question of the kay". The Giriama council of elders were unsuccessful in rescinding the British policies as they could not draw on an effective military system, rather it was “was neither permanent, aggressive, nor particularly strong. Nor did they draw on a political bureaucracy to organize all Giriama-their traditional political organisation. (Brantley, 1981, p.2).

Culture

Kinship and language 
Their language is called Kigiriama, or Kigiryama, and is a sub-language of the Kimijikenda. The nine Mijikenda groups speak closely related languages, all types of Bantu language, which is the same group to which the more widely known Swahili belongs. The Giriama have numerous affinal terms which represents the importance of kinship in the Giriama community. “First, siblings, parallel cousins and cross cousins may all be referred to by the same term. Second, there is bifurcate merging in the immediately ascending generation, such that a father and father's brother are called by the same name, but not the mother's brother; and that a mother and mother's sister are called by the same name, but not the father's sister. Marriage may occu’r with all cousins except a patrilateral parallel cousin, and into all clans except the patri-clan”(Parkin, 1991, p. 236)

The Giriama people have their own unique lifestyle and kinship in which they have their own unique languages, affinal terms and marriage tradition. The two traditional main languages that is spoken in Giriama are KiGirimia and KiSwahili which are both very similar linguistically. The Giriama use their language of kinship to how importance of family and relationship where the “terms of address between alternate generations are reciprocated by members of the same sex or are reciprocally equivalent between members of different sex…between adjacent generations, certain terms are reciprocal or reciprocally equivalent, e.g. mother's brother/sister's son, parent-in-law/daughter's husband, but are otherwise reciprocated with different terms. The eldest of a group of brothers is commonly addressed with respect forms and behaviour, unlike other brothers who use familiar forms. (Parkin, 1991, p.236). The Giriama have numerous affinal terms which represents the importance of kinship in the Giriama community. “First, siblings, parallel cousins and cross cousins may all be referred to by the same term. Second, there is bifurcate merging in the immediately ascending generation, such that a father and father's brother are called by the same name, but not the mother's brother; and that a mother and mother's sister are called by the same name, but not the father's sister. Marriage may occu’r with all cousins except a patrilateral parallel cousin, and into all clans except the patri-clan”(Parkin, 1991, p. 236)

Traditions in the Giriama community 

Through Giriama culture, many of the Giriama people “organize themselves in family groups that are strongly patrilineal.” (Beckloff, 2009, p. 12) This form of Giriama tradition started from Giriama's long history which dates to 150 years ago where the Giriama establishment was located in cities called Kaya.“These cities were governed by elders who exercised a great deal of sway over Giriama life and beliefs…by the time of British colonization these kaya remained largely as cultural symbols inhabited by only a few elders. (Beckloff, 2009, p.12). Overtime, much like communities the Giriama has also developed their culture to adapt to their surrounding as other “the Giriama have since significantly expanded the area they inhabit and any central governing systems have disappeared. This leadership has been replaced by homestead elders making decisions that govern their families and in contemporary households, a patriarch and his wives and sons and their wives and children live together as a homestead composed of several houses.  (Beckloff, 2009, p.12). Like many communities, the men are traditionally responsible for taking care of the family by providing food and working in which the wives mothers and female members of the families were tasked with household duties such as maintaining the houses. Ultimately, the culture in Giriama is heavily emphasised on the younger generation and their unconditional respect to their elders as the elders are portrayed to be the wisest amongst the Giriama community.

Dress and weddings 
The Giriama people have adopted their own traditional method that is arranged by the parents where the bride is ‘priced’ and given to their sons.  Marriage may occur with all cousins except a patrilateral parallel cousin, and into all clans except the patri-clan (Parkin, 1991, p. 236) The price would typically be in the form of liquor. Like many other wedding traditions, a Giriama wedding consists of music, dancing, gifts and the fathers-in-law would bless the new couple by spitting water onto the chests of the couple. The people of Giriama have a variety of fashion as traditionally they were involved in foreign trade, trading their iron for foreign clothing wear. “Although some of the younger generation have adopted Western dress, most Giriama still wear imported cloth wrappers; the elders wear a waist cloth and carry a walking stick; and some Giriama women still wear the traditional short, layered skirts which resemble ballet tutus. (Brantley, 1981, p.6)

Economy 
The Giriama are mainly farmers. The Giriama produced numerous goods that would boost its economy through the distribution of reared cow, goats and sheep. The Giriama also grew numerous crops that would be essential for the foreign market such as cassava, maize, cotton, millet, rice, coconuts, cassava and oil palms.
The majority of the trade that Giriama involved with was with the Arabs and Swahili which they trades their grown crops and essential materials such as iron for foreign goods such as beads and clothes from overseas.

Religion 

Majority of the Giriama adhere to their traditional beliefs or Christianity. A minority practice Islam. The Giriama people experience spirit possession.

There are numerous religions and traditions that the people of Giriama people practice. Some people follow the traditions of the past whilst some indulged in the faith of Islam or Christianity after the influence of the foreigners such as the British or Arab. The Giriama people traditionally believed in the spiritual god ‘Mulingu’ and the religion “lacked priests, territorial or spirit-possession cults, or even an innovative leader to translate old customs, such as the eradication of witchcraft” (Brantley, 1981, p. 4). Instead, traditional Giriama religion revolves around the “realms of conversion practices, spirit discourses and spirit possession, divination, ritual code switching, and other ritual forms” (McIntosh, 2009,p. 4).

Through their belief In Mulingu, the Giriama people would carve hardwood in the shape of human beings called Vigangon which would be offered as sacrifices to Mulingu to oppose calamities such as sicknesses and environment dangers. Traditional Giriama religion is still being practiced today, however majority of the Giriama people have converted to either Christianity or Islam. Giriama have long been pressed to convert to Islam by Swahili and Arab patrons, employers, and prospective kinby-marriage, but for at least forty years, these pressures have taken supranatural as well as social forms.. (McIntosh, 2004, p. 93).

See also
 Mekatilili Wa Menza, a Giriama woman warrior.
 Malaika Firth (born 1994), fashion model.

References
Brantley, C. (1981). The Giriama and Colonial Resistance in Kenya, 1800–1920. University of California Press.

Beckloff, R., Merriam, S. (2009). LOCAL AGRICULTURAL KNOWLEDGE CONSTRUCTION AMONG THE GIRIAMA PEOPLE OF RURAL COASTAL KENYA. The University of Georgia.

McIntosh, J. (2004).RELUCTANT MUSLIMS: EMBODIED HEGEMONY AND MORAL RESISTANCE IN A GIRIAMA SPIRIT POSSESSION COMPLEX. The Journal of the Royal Anthropological Institute, Mar., 2004, Vol. 10, No. 1 (Mar., 2004), pp. 91–112.

McIntosh, J. (2009). The Edge of Islam: Power, Personhood, and Ethnoreligious Boundaries on the Kenya Coast. DURHAM; LONDON: Duke University Press.

Parkin, D. (1991). The Sacred Void: Spatial Images of Work and Ritual among the Giriama of Kenya (Cambridge Studies in Social and Cultural Anthropology). Cambridge: Cambridge University Press.

Patterson, D. (1970). The Giriama Risings of 1913–1914. Boston University African Studies Centre.

Temu, A. (1971). THE GIRIAMA WAR, 1914–1915. Journal of Eastern African Research & Development. Gideon Were Publications.

External links

 
Mijikenda